Melmore may refer to:

 Melmore, Ohio, census-designated place in Ohio, United States
 SS Melmore (1892), passenger cargo vessel operated by the Great Western Railway from 1905 to 1912
 Natalie Melmore, English lawn bowler